Jacques Haman is a Cameroonian footballer who plays as a centre forward for Al-Hussein SC (Irbid)  in the Jordani League.

References

Honours

Coton Sport
 Cameroon Division 1-Elite One Champion: 2010/11, 2013

External links
 
 

1994 births
Living people
Cameroonian footballers
Cameroonian expatriate footballers
Cameroon international footballers
Association football forwards
Coton Sport FC de Garoua players
FC Montreal players
Expatriate soccer players in Canada
USL Championship players
Vitória S.C. B players
Expatriate footballers in Portugal
Liga Portugal 2 players